Selima Sfar (born 8 July 1977) is a retired Tunisian tennis player.

She turned professional in 1999 and has been ranked as high as 75th in the world (16 July 2001). Sfar is the second highest ranked female Tunisian and Arab player. She has experienced most of her success in ITF tournaments, winning 11 singles titles and 21 doubles titles.

Biography
Left Tunis at age 13 to live and train with Nathalie Tauziat in Biarritz, France. The serve-and-volleyer preferred indoor hardcourts; favorite shots were serve, backhand. Father, Moncef, is a physician; mother, Zeineb, is a dermatologist; older sister is Sonia and younger brother is Hassan.

Most memorable experience was qualifying for her favourite tournament, the US Open, in 2000.

Tennis career
Sfar was able to receive wildcards for Middle Eastern tournaments in Qatar and the United Arab Emirates. At the Dubai Tennis Championships in 2001, she reached the quarterfinals, beating Silvija Talaja and Barbara Schett before being defeated by Nathalie Tauziat, in three sets.

Sfar played for the Tunisia Fed Cup team, going 41–24. She also competed in the 1996 Summer Olympics, losing in the first round to Brenda Schultz-McCarthy, and the 2008 Summer Olympics, losing in the first round to Caroline Wozniacki. Sfar holds the records for the Tunesian in the Fed Cup with the most wins, the most singles wins, the most doubles wins, the most ties played, and the most years played.

At the 2008 Wimbledon Championships, Sfar and her partner Ekaterina Makarova reached the quarterfinals of the ladies' doubles, before they were defeated by Lisa Raymond and Samantha Stosur.

In 2011, Sfar announced her retirement from professional tennis.
In the meantime, she became a commentator for Qatari sports channel "JSC Sport".

At the 2015 Wimbledon Championships, Sfar teamed with Martina Navratilova for the Invitational Ladies Doubles, and they won all three of their matches in their group.

ITF finals

Singles: 19 (11–8)

Doubles: 33 (21–12)

References

External links
 
 
 

1977 births
Living people
People from Tunis Governorate
Tunisian expatriate sportspeople in France
Tunisian expatriate sportspeople in Qatar
Tunisian female tennis players
Olympic tennis players of Tunisia
Tennis players at the 1996 Summer Olympics
Tennis players at the 2000 Summer Olympics
Tennis players at the 2008 Summer Olympics
20th-century Tunisian women
21st-century Tunisian women